is a kind of traditional Japanese music played on the  and used in kabuki theater, primarily to accompany dance and to provide reflective interludes.

History 

However, there is no musical notation in this collection, meaning that it is only possible to make observations about  lyrics, which tend to be longer than other texts.

Many of the "classic"  repertoire was composed in the 19th century, which is the time of the best-known  composers as well. Many pieces are based on Noh theater, partly due to the number of kabuki plays derived from Noh theater pieces, and many were revived during the 19th century. There is evidence of the influence of Japanese folk music on  too.

During the 19th century,  (concert ) developed as a style of  composed for non-kabuki, non-dance performances in which a performer's skill was emphasized.

References

Further reading 
 William P. Malm, Nagauta: the heart of kabuki music (C. E. Tuttle, 1963) Internet Archive copy

External links 
 Recording of  Symphony 

Japanese styles of music
Japanese traditional music
Kabuki
Japanese words and phrases